Aruni Rajapaksha is a Sri Lankan model, film actress and television presenter.

Personal life
Aruni Rajapaksha was born in Kalpitiya, Sri Lanka, and raised in Kandy. After taking the G.C.E. Advanced Level examination, Aruni joined the Kandy Technical College to do a secretarial course. During that period, she organized fashion shows in Kandy leading her to take on a career in modelling. Aruni is currently married to Nalin Samarawickrama and the mother of twin girls.

Career
In 2004, Aruni won the title of Udarata Menike and the Capri Beauty queen 2005 crown.

She also competed in the Miss Tourism Queen International 2007 (China) and Miss International 2007 (Japan) competitions.

In 2012, Aruni secured the 3rd place at the 2nd edition of Bride of the World 2012 competition held in Macau, China.

Filmography

Career as a host
Aruni hosted the morning show "Hello Sri Lanka" and the women's program "Liyasevana" at Swarnavahini from 2008 to 2011. She returned to Swarnavahini in June 2020 to host the relaunched breakfast show "Ayubowan Sri Lanka." Aruni hosted the TV show "Niwaduwata travel ekak" on Hiru TV, as well as the sociological and legal program 'Mang Hinda Oba'.

References

External links 
Aruni Rajapaksha's Biography in Sinhala Cinema Database

Sri Lankan film actresses
Sri Lankan female models
1984 births
Living people
Miss International 2007 delegates
Sri Lankan beauty pageant winners
Sinhalese actresses
20th-century Sri Lankan actresses
Miss Universe 2008 contestants
Sri Lankan television presenters